The 2013–14 Moldovan National Division (Moldovan: Divizia Națională) is the 23rd season of top-tier football in Moldova. The competition began in July 2013 and ended in May 2014.

Teams

Stadia and locations

Personnel and sponsorship

League table

Positions by round
The following table represents the teams position after each round in the competition.

Results
The schedule consists of three rounds. During the first two rounds, each team plays each other once home and away for a total of 22 matches. The pairings of the third round will then be set according to the standings after the first two rounds, giving every team a third game against each opponent for a total of 33 games per team.

First and second round

Third round
Key numbers for pairing determination (number marks position after 22 games):

Top goalscorers
Updated to matches played on 21 May 2014. 

8 goals (4 players)

  Yevhen Zarichnyuk (Tiraspol)
  Alexandru Dedov (Zimbru Chișinău)
  Georgi Karaneychev (Tiraspol)
  Ricardinho (Sheriff Tiraspol)

7 goals (7 players)

  Mihai Țurcan (Veris Chișinău)
  Anatolie Doroș (Veris Chișinău(2) & Rapid Ghidighici (5))
  Oleg Molla (Dacia Chișinău(5) & Tiraspol (2))
  Ghenadie Orbu (Dacia Chișinău)
  Cadú (Sheriff Tiraspol)
  Konstantin Yavorskiy (Milsami)
  Ion Lăcustă (Olimpia)

6 goals (8 players)

  Iurie Levandovschi (Rapid Ghidighici)
  Maxwell Egwuatu (Costuleni)
  Daniel Pîslă (Costuleni)
  Andrei Bugneac (Costuleni)
  Serghei Alexeev (Veris Chișinău)
  Vladislav Ivanov (Costuleni)
  Radu Gînsari (Zimbru Chișinău)
  Sergiu Ciuico (Dinamo-Auto Tiraspol)

5 goals (10 players)

  Alexandru Sergiu Grosu (Tiraspol)
  Victor Truhanov (Dinamo-Auto Tiraspol)
  Andrei Novicov (Tiraspol)
  Gheorghe Ovseannicov (Dacia Chișinău (4) & Tiraspol (1))
  Vasili Pavlov (Dacia Chișinău)
  Vadim Cemîrtan (Costuleni)
  Guilherme de Paula (Milsami)
  Bogdan Hauși (Tiraspol)
  Serhiy Shapoval (Tiraspol)
  Maxim Iurcu (Dinamo-Auto Tiraspol)

4 goals (13 players)

  Stanislav Luca (Rapid Ghidighici)
  Alexandru Antoniuc (Veris Chișinău)
  Artur Pătraș (Milsami)
  Petru Leucă (Milsami)
  Ivan Knežević (Dacia Chișinău)
  Anatolii Cheptine (Zimbru Chișinău)
  Maxim Mihaliov (Dacia Chișinău)
  Eugen Gorodețchi (Dinamo-Auto Tiraspol)
  Ademar (Zimbru Chișinău)
  Victor Bulat (Tiraspol)
  Octavian Onofrei (Speranța Crihana)
  Constantin Bogdan (Zimbru Chișinău)
  Boris Țugui (Speranța Crihana)

3 goals (16 players)

  Serghei Gheorghiev (Tiraspol (2) & Dinamo-Auto Tiraspol (1))
  Maxim Repinețchi (Olimpia (2) & Academia Chișinău (1))
  Nicolae Milinceanu (Veris Chișinău)
  Dumitru Bacal (Rapid Ghidighici)
  Alexandru Maxim (Academia Chișinău)
  Radivoje Golubović (Dacia Chișinău)
  Marcel Metoua (Sheriff Tiraspol)
  Gheorghe Andronic (Milsami)
  Melli (Sheriff Tiraspol)
  Andrei Marina (Olimpia)
  Alexandru Bejan (Dacia Chișinău)
  Andrejs Kovaļovs (Dacia Chișinău)
  Petru Ojog (Costuleni)
  Petru Racu (Veris Chișinău)
  Andrian Cașcaval (Veris Chișinău)
  Mihai Ungureanu (Olimpia)

2 goals (24 players)

  Vadim Bolohan (Milsami)
  Vadim Crîcimari (Zimbru Chișinău)
  Petru Stîngă (Speranța Crihana)
  Ivan Carandașov (Costuleni)
  Arkadi Halperin (Academia Chișinău)
  Maxim Focșa (Academia Chișinău)
  Akhmet Barakhoyev (Dacia Chișinău)
  Sergiu Matei (Speranța Crihana)
  Veaceslav Lisa (Sheriff Tiraspol)
  Ion Ursu (Veris Chișinău)
  Andrei Cojocari (Zimbru Chișinău)
  Sergiu Cojocari (Veris Chișinău)
  Maxim Antoniuc (Veris Chișinău)
  Ibrahima Camara (Dacia Chișinău)
  Chiril Covali (Dinamo-Auto Tiraspol)
  Victor Mudrac (Olimpia (1) & Dinamo-Auto Tiraspol (1))
  Fernando (Sheriff Tiraspol)
  Cornel Gheți (Milsami)
  Vitalie Plămădeală (Rapid Ghidighici)
  Albert Bogatyrev (Olimpia)
  Vadim Rață (Tiraspol)
  Valeriu Tiron (Veris Chișinău)
  Vadim Paireli (Sheriff Tiraspol)
  Karlo Belak (Milsami)

1 goal (70 players)

  Dan Spătaru (Zimbru Chișinău)
  Dzmitry Klimovich (Zimbru Chișinău)
  Quintela (Zimbru Chișinău)
  Jean-Marie Amani (Zimbru Chișinău)
  Radu Catan (Zimbru Chișinău)
  Iulian Erhan (Zimbru Chișinău)
  Kiril Pavlyuchek (Zimbru Chișinău)
  Marko Markovski (Sheriff Tiraspol)
  Alexandru Pașcenco (Sheriff Tiraspol)
  Miral Samardžić (Sheriff Tiraspol)
  Kobi Moyal (Sheriff Tiraspol)
  Valentin Bîrdan (Sheriff Tiraspol)
  Valentin Furdui (Sheriff Tiraspol)
  Wilfried Balima (Sheriff Tiraspol)
  Valerii Macrițchii (Sheriff Tiraspol)
  Vladimir Potlog (Rapid Ghidighici)
  Alexandru Leu (Rapid Ghidighici)
  Dumitru Bogdan (Rapid Ghidighici)
  Ion Arabadji (Rapid Ghidighici)
  Ovye Monday Shedrack (Milsami)
  Rareș Soporan (Milsami)
  Boubacar Ouédraogo (Milsami)
  Vitalie Zlatan (Milsami)
  Lucas De Lima (Milsami)
  Adil Rhaili (Milsami)
  Radu Rogac (Olimpia)
  Iurie Bodean (Olimpia)
  Alexandru Grab (Olimpia)
  Ion Laevschii (Olimpia)
  Danu Bojîi (Olimpia)
  Alexandru Bîcov (Dinamo-Auto Tiraspol)
  Nicolai Rudac (Dinamo-Auto Tiraspol)
  Alexandru Arabadji (Dinamo-Auto Tiraspol)
  Mihail Paseciniuc (Dinamo-Auto Tiraspol)
  Dumitru Dolgov (Dinamo-Auto Tiraspol)
  Maxim Orindas (Speranța Crihana)
  Eugen Gorceac (Speranța Crihana)
  Timur Vâlcu (Speranța Crihana)
  Nichita Semcov (Speranța Crihana)
  Eugen Celeadnic (Speranța Crihana)
  Cristian Cîrlan (Veris Chișinău)
  Ion Popușoi (Veris Chișinău)
  Eugen Zasavițchi (Veris Chișinău)
  Pavel Novitskiy (Veris Chișinău)
  Nicolae Josan (Veris Chișinău)
  Yuri Shevel (Dacia Chișinău)
  Nicolae Orlovschi (Dacia Chișinău)
  Arafat Djako (Dacia Chișinău)
  Eugeniu Cociuc (Dacia Chișinău)
  Marian Stoleru (Dacia Chișinău)
  Jude Ogada (Dacia Chișinău)
  Volodymyr Zastavnyi (Dacia Chișinău)
  Veaceslav Posmac (Dacia Chișinău)
  Artyom Khachaturov (Tiraspol)
  Igor Poiarcov (Tiraspol)
  Alexandru Popovici (Tiraspol)
  Charles Newuche (Tiraspol)
  Dumitru Popovici (Tiraspol)
  Eugeniu Rebenja (Tiraspol)
  Dimitar Petkov (Tiraspol)
  Alexandru Cheltuială (Costuleni)
  Vitalie Negru (Costuleni)
  Sergiu Sîrbu (Costuleni)
  Oleg Șișchin (Academia Chișinău)
  Ion Burlacu (Academia Chișinău)
  Ștefan Caraulan (Academia Chișinău)
  Dan Cațer (Academia Chișinău)
  Serghei Bobrov (Academia Chișinău)
  Adama Ben Kone (Academia Chișinău)
  Igor Picus (Academia Chișinău)

Hat-tricks

Clean sheets

Disciplinary

Fair-Play Award

We have allocated points to each yellow (1 point), two yellow (2 points) and red card (3 points) for ranking purposes. Please note that this does not represent any official rankings.

Attendances

References

External links
 Official website

1
Moldovan Super Liga seasons
Moldova 1